The Volvo Brage/Starke/Raske was a series of medium size trucks produced by Swedish automaker Volvo between 1954 and 1972.

Volvo Brage 
In 1954 Volvo introduced the medium-sized truck L370 Brage, named after the Norse god Bragi. The truck had a payload of 4.5 tonnes. Brage had an overhead valve petrol engine. In 1955 a budget model called L360 was added. It had a reduced payload of 3.5 tonnes and a side-valve engine. The L360, which was never called Brage, was discontinued in 1957. Early trucks had a non-synchronized four-speed gear box, but this was soon replaced by a synchronized five-speed transmission. Demand for trucks with petrol engines declined with rising fuel prices and the Brage model was discontinued in 1963.

Volvo Starke 
Parallel with the Brage model Volvo offered a diesel version called L375 Starke ("Strong"), with a payload of 4.5 tonnes. In 1955 the budget model L365 was added, with a payload of 3.5 tonnes but it was discontinued the following year. Also Starke soon got its unsynchronized gear box replaced with a more modern five-speed gear box.

In 1961 the truck's name was changed to L465 Starke.

Volvo Raske 
In 1961 the sturdier L475 Raske ("Swift") was introduced, with a payload of 5 tonnes. Besides Starke's diesel engine Raske was offered with a turbo-diesel.

In 1962 Volvo added the forward control L4751 Raske Tiptop with a tilting cab to the program.

Volvo N84 

Volvo introduced its "System 8" in 1965. The Starke model carried on with the new name N84. The major change for the truck was a more powerful engine.

Other

In Norway, this series of trucks were nicknamed "Bamse"(a diminutive for "bear", also meaning "teddy bear")The original names are mostly unknown. The bigger "Viking" retained its original name.

Engines

References

External links 

 Volvo Trucks Global – history
 Swedish brass cars – picture gallery

Brage
Vehicles introduced in 1954